Andesi Setyo Prabowo (born October 1, 1989) is an Indonesian professional footballer who plays as a midfielder for Liga 3 club Persikasi Bekasi.

Club statistics

Hounors

Clubs
Pelita Jaya U-21
 Indonesia Super League U-21: 2008-09
 Indonesia Super League U-21 runner-up: 2009-10
PSCS Cilacap
 Indonesia Soccer Championship B: 2016

References

External links

1989 births
Living people
Association football midfielders
Indonesian footballers
Liga 1 (Indonesia) players
Pelita Jaya FC players
People from Banyumas Regency
Sportspeople from Central Java